Pihtla Parish was a municipality in Saare County, Estonia. The municipality had a population of 1,400 (as of 1 January 2006) and covered an area of 228.11 km².

During the administrative-territorial reform in 2017, all 12 municipalities on the island Saaremaa were merged into a single municipality – Saaremaa Parish.

Villages
Eiste - Ennu - Haeska - Hämmelepa - Iilaste - Ilpla - Kaali - Kailuka - Kangrusselja - Kiritu - Kõljala - Kõnnu - Kuusiku - Laheküla - Leina - Liiva - Liiva-Putla - Masa - Matsiranna - Metsaküla - Mustla - Nässuma - Pihtla - Püha - Rahniku - Räimaste - Rannaküla - Reeküla - Reo - Sagariste - Salavere - Sandla - Sauaru - Saue-Putla - Sepa - Sutu - Suure-Rootsi - Tõlluste - Väike-Rootsi - Väljaküla - Vanamõisa

See also
 Municipalities of Estonia

References